Spathosternum is a genus of grasshoppers in the family Acrididae: subfamily Spathosterninae, with species found in Africa, including Madagascar and tropical Asia.

Species
The Catalogue of Life lists:
Spathosternum abbreviatum Uvarov, 1929
Spathosternum brevipenne Chopard, 1958
Spathosternum curtum Uvarov, 1953
Spathosternum malagassum Dirsh, 1962
Spathosternum nigrotaeniatum Stål, 1876 - type species (as Tristria nigro-taeniata Stål)
Spathosternum planoantennatum Ingrisch, 1986
Spathosternum prasiniferum Walker, 1871
Spathosternum pygmaeum Karsch, 1893
Spathosternum venulosum Stål, 1878

References

External links

Acrididae
Insects of Southeast Asia
Insects of Africa